"Cost of Living" is the 120th episode of the American science fiction television show Star Trek: The Next Generation. The 20th episode of the fifth season. It was broadcast in syndication on April 20, 1992. The episode won two Emmy awards.

Set in the 24th century, the series follows the adventures of the Starfleet crew of the Federation starship Enterprise-D. In this episode, as undetectable parasites devour the ship, Lwaxana Troi takes Worf's son Alexander under her wing  encouraging him to adopt her carefree ways en route to meeting a man she's blindly agreed to marry.

This episode features the recurring characters of Worf's son Alexander and Lwaxana Troi.

Plot

Lwaxana Troi arrives on the Enterprise, announcing that she will be holding her wedding there with a man that shares many interests with her, as judged by a computerized matchmaking system. Captain Jean-Luc Picard, initially wary of Lwaxana's plans, is relieved that all she wants from him is to give her away as the bride. Deanna Troi talks to her mother Lwaxana about the marriage, and while she is happy that she is marrying again, she is surprised and disappointed that she will not follow the Betazoid custom of being a naked bride at the wedding. Lwaxana informs her that such customs offend the groom and his people. Deanna criticizes her for abandoning her own custom given the rank that she holds.

Meanwhile, Worf is having difficulties in getting his son Alexander to complete his obligations such as homework and chores. Deanna offers the idea of creating a contract that would allow Alexander to have time to play after completing his tasks. While this initially seems to be acceptable to Alexander, Lwaxana arrives and downplays the idea. Lwaxana makes friends with Alexander, taking him to a holodeck simulation of the Parallax colony despite Worf's orders. Lwaxana encourages Alexander to be a free spirit, but Deanna believes that Lwaxana's message is confusing Alexander.

Eventually, Campio, Lwaxana's husband-to-be, arrives at the Enterprise, and Lwaxana finds that he is not as perfect a fit for her as the computer match suggested, being more strict and demanding than she was led to believe. She evades Campio by taking Alexander to the holodeck. There, Alexander reiterates some of the advice she had previously given him. Taking it to heart, Lwaxana arrives at the wedding naked as per Betazoid custom, and Campio, offended, leaves her at the altar. Lwaxana winks at Alexander, who smiles in turn.

During these events, the Enterprise becomes infected with an undetectable parasite that feeds off nitrium, a component used in most of the starship's materials. Though initial system failures are attributed to normal wear, they become concerned when warp and life support systems begin to fail. The crew is able to identify the parasite, and as life systems fail and cause the crew to pass out due to lack of air. Data, who is able to function without oxygen, navigates the starship to a nearby asteroid field rich in nitrium and coerces the parasite to move there. Ship systems are quickly restored to normal before the wedding.

Afterwards Lwaxana relaxes in the Holodeck simulated Parallax colony mudbaths along with Deanna, Alexander, and Worf. Lwaxana admits she made a mistake with Campio and thanks Alexander for helping her out. Meanwhile, a confused and annoyed Worf asks, "You're just supposed to sit here?"

Reception 
In 2011, The A.V. Club gave this episode a "C" lamenting "Alexander is still insanely annoying" and was unhappy with many other elements in the episode offering a tour de force of complaints.
Keith DeCandido of Tor.com rated it 4 out of 10.

This episode was noted in 2018 by TheGamer, for including "sad acrobats, hairy dudes in mud baths and mute dancers" as well as a floating clown-head on the holodeck, which led one review to rank it as the 21st creepiest scene in all Star Trek.

Awards
The episode won two Emmy awards, one for Outstanding Individual Achievement in Costume Design for a Series and another for  Outstanding Individual Achievement in Makeup for a Series.

References

External links
 
 

Star Trek: The Next Generation (season 5) episodes
1992 American television episodes
Emmy Award-winning episodes
Television episodes about weddings